Platanthera algeriensis is a species of orchid native to eastern and southeastern Spain, Corsica, Sardinia, Algeria and Morocco.

References

External links 

Zipcodezoo

algeriensis
Flora of North Africa
Plants described in 1892